Huncote is a village and civil parish in the district of Blaby in the county of Leicestershire, England.  It is just west of Narborough, and is on the Thurlaston Brook.

The place-name Huncote is the etymological root of the American surnames Hunnicutt, and Honeycut.

The Village

The village is small but still benefits from several amenities including a village pub (The Red Lion), the Post office, a Spar shop, a Newsagent's shop, three hairdressers, a fish and chip shop, an Indian takeaway and a local park. .

At the edge of the village is Huncote Leisure Centre and further along the Forest Road, near to the M69 motorway, is the home of Leicester Animal Aid, a pet rescue centre. Huncote also has a woodyard, and a residential care home for the elderly.

In October 2015, the post office was moved into the Spar shop and now caters for both needs.

Sport

Huncote provides sporting facilities with a running club (Huncote Harriers) and BMX club (Huncote Hornets) whose home track (opened 2015) is based behind the Leisure Centre and is one of the top BMX tracks in the country.

Huncote also have a football team, Huncote Sports F. C., who play in the Leicester & District Premier Division and who used to be members of the Leicestershire Senior League. In the 2014/15 season Huncote won the '3 Sons Trophy' knockout competition, beating local rivals Magna 73 F. C. after a penalty shoot-out. Huncote's home ground is actually based on the outskirts of neighbouring village Thurlaston. The club have a Football Foundation standard clubhouse and share the facilities with Huncote Cricket Club.

See also 
 Richard Armitage, grew up in Huncote

Notes

Villages in Leicestershire
Civil parishes in Leicestershire
Blaby